Sheffield Grammar School began in 1604 as "The Free Grammar School of James King of England within the Town of Sheffield in the County of York" in buildings in the Townhead area of Sheffield, resulting from the benefaction of John Smith of Crowland. In the Gazetteer and General Directory of Sheffield and Twenty Miles Round, by William White, published in 1852, the author refers to the "FREE GRAMMAR SCHOOL", noting that it "is a commodious and handsome stone building in Charlotte Street, erected by subscription in 1825, in lieu of the ancient school which stood near the top of Townhead Street. It was founded by letters patent of James I in 1604, and the Vicar and Church Burgesses are the trustees and governors".

It led a nomadic existence on various sites before taking over the Sheffield Collegiate School on Collegiate Crescent in 1884. 
James A. Figorski describes the premises at St. George's Square, which the school occupied in 1868, as follows "It was a stone building which I think was in keeping with St. George's Church. From St. George's Square you entered through a stone archway and there to the left was the small caretaker's house, and then the pathway went round to the porch, into which the main door opened to the large main room of the school. The floor was stone flagged and was very cold in winter. A stove stood in the centre of the room, cracked and worn. We had no gas, and water was turned on into an old stone trough at play-hours outside the school".

The school, at its Collegiate Crescent site, was renamed Sheffield Royal Grammar School (SRGS) in 1885. SRGS's motto was "Verbum tuum lucerna pedibus meis" – "Thy word is a lamp unto my feet".

In 1905 Sheffield City Council acquired both Wesley College and SRGS and they were merged on the site of the former to form King Edward VII School (KES), named after the reigning monarch.

Headmasters of Sheffield Grammar School

Notable old boys of Sheffield Grammar School 

John Balguy (1686–1748) – divine and philosopher (NB His father Thomas Balguy was Head 1664–1696)
Charles Sargeant Jagger MC (1885–1934) – war memorials sculptor
 Edward Keble Chatterton (1878–1944) – prolific author on maritime and naval themes
 Robert Murray Gilchrist (1867–1917) – novelist and Peak District author
 Kenneth Kirk (1886–1954) – Bishop of Oxford from 1937–1954
 John Roebuck (1718–1794) – inventor
 Reverend Walter Stanley Senior (1876–1938), the "Bard of Lanka", SRGS pupil from 1888 to 1891
 Sir Samuel Gillott (1838–1913) – Mayor of Melbourne, Australian Attorney General, and Employment Minister 1904–06

Notable staff of Sheffield Grammar School 
 Mountford John Byrde Baddeley (1843–1906) – guidebook writer, classics master (1880-1884)
 Sir Sydney John Chapman  (1871–1951)  – Chief Economic Adviser to HM Government from 1927 to 1932, schoolmaster at Sheffield Royal Grammar School from 1893 to 1895

References
 Cornwell, John (2005). King Ted's (1st ed.). King Edward VII School, Sheffield. . (This book reviews the period from 1604 to 1905, although its bulk is concerned with 1905–2005.)

External links
King Edward VII School and Language College
Old Edwardians – site for alumni association + archive material
Sheffield Collegiate School  – Sheffield Collegiate School history on Sheffield Collegiate Cricket Club's site

Defunct grammar schools in England
Defunct schools in Sheffield
Educational institutions established in the 1600s
1604 establishments in England
Educational institutions disestablished in 1905
1905 disestablishments in England